The 7th Canadian Comedy Awards, presented by the Canadian Comedy Foundation for Excellence (CCFE), honoured the best live, television, and film comedy of 2005 and was held on 27 October 2006 in London, Ontario. The ceremony was hosted by Debra DiGiovanni.

Canadian Comedy Awards, also known as Beavers, were awarded in 20 categories. Winners were picked by members of ACTRA (Alliance of Canadian Cinema, Television and Radio Artists), the Canadian Actors' Equity Association, the Writers Guild of Canada, the Directors Guild of Canada, and the Comedy Association.

TV series Corner Gas led with seven nominations followed by the film Leo with four.  Corner Gas won two Beavers as did Mark McKinney for the second season of Slings & Arrows.  Mike MacDonald received the first Dave Broadfoot Award for comic genius.

The ceremony was held during the five-day Canadian Comedy Awards Festival which showcased performances by the nominees and other artists.  A gala review on the final day of the festival was taped and broadcast by The Comedy Network, marking the awards' first television presence since 2001.

Festival

The 6th Canadian Comedy Awards and Festival ran from 24 to 28 October 2005 in London, Ontario, its fourth year in the city.  Each day featured talent showcases by local comics, nominees and other visiting performers.  There were also workshops including one on laughter in the workplace.

The festival was closed with a gala review on 28 October, the night following the awards ceremony, hosted by Mark McKinney and featuring the Royal Canadian Air Farce, Mike MacDonald and Derek Edwards.  This gala was taped and broadcast by The Comedy Network, marking the Canadian Comedy Awards' first presence on television since 2001.

Ceremony

The 6th Canadian Comedy Awards ceremony was held on 27 October 2006, hosted by Debra DiGiovanni, the 2002 winner for best stand-up newcomer.

Winners and nominees
Winners were voted on by 18,000 members of ACTRA (Alliance of Canadian Cinema, Television and Radio Artists), the Canadian Actors' Equity Association, the Writers Guild of Canada, the Directors Guild of Canada, and the Comedy Association.  Winners are listed first and highlighted in boldface:

Live

Television

Film

Special Awards

Multiple wins
The following people, shows, films, etc. received multiple awards

Multiple nominations
The following people, shows, films, etc. received multiple nominations

References

External links
Canadian Comedy Awards official website

Canadian Comedy Awards
Canadian Comedy Awards
Awards
Awards